Uusivirta is a surname. Notable people with the surname include:

Mauno Uusivirta (born 1948), Finnish racing cyclist
Olavi Uusivirta (born 1983), Finnish singer, songwriter, and actor
Tarmo Uusivirta (1957–1999), Finnish boxer 

Finnish-language surnames